Hans Brattrud (25 September 1933 – 16 March 2017) was a Norwegian furniture designer and architect.

He was born in Dokka, and educated at the Norwegian National Academy of Craft and Art Industry. His designs include the chair Scandia Jr., Grorudstolen, the table Fagott, and the armchair Comet. From 1964 he started practicing as architect, and was eventually manager of the prefabricated house company Bra-bo Elementbygg. He was awarded  for his furniture design in 1967, and received the King's Medal of Merit in gold in 2008.

References

1933 births
2017 deaths
People from Nordre Land
Norwegian furniture designers
20th-century Norwegian architects
21st-century Norwegian architects
Oslo National Academy of the Arts alumni
Recipients of the King's Medal of Merit in gold